"Fallen Angel" is a song by British soft rock band Rogue from their debut album Fallen Angels. Produced by band member Guy Fletcher, it was released as a single in 1975 and was a hit in the Netherlands, peaking at No. 12 on the Dutch Top 40. In the U.S., the song missed the Billboard Hot 100 by 8 places, reaching No. 108 in 1976 (No. 8 on the Bubbling Under the Hot 100 chart).

Frankie Valli cover
In 1976, the song was covered by Frankie Valli; this version was a hit in both the UK and U.S., peaking at numbers 11 and 36, respectively. On the U.S. Adult Contemporary chart, the song peaked at No. 9. Its biggest success was in Ireland, where it reached No. 3 on the Irish Singles Chart. 

The song is featured in the Broadway musical Jersey Boys. The musical repurposes the song as its eleven o'clock number, sung by Valli as he mourns the death of his daughter Francine (who in real life died four years after the song was released).

Chart history
Rogue

Frankie Valli cover

References

1975 songs
1975 singles
1976 singles
Rogue (band) songs
Frankie Valli songs
Epic Records singles
Private Stock Records singles
Songs written by Guy Fletcher (songwriter)
Songs written by Doug Flett